Charles Garnet Fynn (24 April 1897 – 26 August 1976) was an English first-class cricketer. A right-handed batsman who bowled right-arm slow, he made his debut for Hampshire against Lancashire in the 1930 County Championship.

From 1930 to 1931 Fynn represented Hampshire in nine first-class matches, with Fynn's final first-class appearance for Hampshire coming against the touring New Zealanders. In his nine matches, Fynn scored 45 runs at an average of 6.42, with a high score of 21. With the ball Fynn took eleven wickets at a bowling average of 40.54, with best figures of 3/92.

Fynn died at Bournemouth, Dorset on 26 August 1976.

External links
Charles Fynn at Cricinfo
Charles Fynn at CricketArchive

1897 births
1976 deaths
People from Marylebone
Cricketers from Greater London
English cricketers
Hampshire cricketers